Anna Mae He ( or He Sijia,) was born on January 28, 1999, in the United States and was the subject of a custody battle between her Chinese biological parents, Jack and Casey He, and her white foster parents, Jerry and Louise Baker. The case, revolving around the Bakers' claim that the Hes had abandoned their rights to the child when they signed a temporary custody order, lasted seven years and received national media attention in the United States.

Background
Anna Mae He's father, Jack, came to the United States in 1995 on a student visa and attended Arizona State. In 1997 he enrolled in the  University of Memphis, receiving a scholarship and a stipend to work as a graduate assistant. Anna Mae's mother, Casey, obtained a visa as Jack's wife and shortly after coming to the United States became pregnant with Anna Mae. During the pregnancy, Jack was accused of sexual assault by a fellow student six days after the reported event in October 1998. The University conducted an investigation of the alleged assault and determined that no one saw Jack or the alleged victim together at the time and location in question. Despite the lack of incriminating evidence, the University terminated Jack  from his graduate-assistant position, resulting in the loss of his stipend and health insurance. Jack was charged with attempted rape but was acquitted by a jury in February 2002. Later during the pregnancy, the couple was involved in an altercation with the alleged rape victim and the alleged victim's husband in a grocery store. Casey was knocked down and suffered vaginal bleeding. Her condition worsened afterward until Anna was delivered by Caesarean section two months later. Faced with a $12,000 hospital bill and a criminal charge with no stable income, the couple sought help from Mid-South Christian Services. Mid-South agreed to place the baby in a foster home with Jerry and Louise Baker for three months. During this time, Jack was arrested for the previous sexual assault accusation, which caused the loss of his new job. With only Casey's income as a waitress to survive on, they searched for someone to take Anna Mae back to China to be cared for by relatives, but were unable to find anyone. Jack, at the time, also suspected that he was not Anna Mae's biological father as he met and married Casey rather abruptly, and Anna was conceived soon after. It was unknown whether his suspicion had contributed to the couple's decision.

Disagreement
Unable to financially care for Anna Mae, the Hes decided to let her remain in the Bakers' custody. The Bakers expressed interest in adopting Anna Mae but the Hes were unwilling. An agreement was reached that would give the Bakers temporary custody and let the Hes retain parental rights. The Bakers claim there was also an oral agreement that the Bakers would raise Anna Mae until she is eighteen years old. But the Hes contend that they did not agree to this and that the arrangement was only temporary. A juvenile court officer's testimony supports the Hes' claim.

On June 2, 1999, Jack He and the Bakers met with a Mid-South Christian Services attorney. In the meeting, the attorney told Jack it would be necessary to go to court to regain custody if all parties did not agree to a change in custody.

On June 4, 1999, the Hes and the Bakers went to the Shelby County Juvenile Court to obtain the consent order transferring custody to the Bakers. Without the knowledge of either party, the juvenile court officer typed a guardianship provision into the consent order. Because Casey He did not speak or read English very well, she was unable to read the documents and had to rely on an interpreter for their meaning. Three witnesses, including the interpreter, reported that Casey was very concerned that the Bakers' custody of Anna Mae be temporary. The juvenile court officer testified that she was "adamant that at some point she wanted her child back." She was told that signing the consent order was necessary for Anna Mae to obtain health insurance and the interpreter testified that she signed the order believing custody to be temporary.

The Hes continued to visit Anna Mae regularly for about an hour a week. Louise Baker began to keep a diary in which she documented the Hes' visits to Anna Mae, writing down when the visits were, how long they lasted, how the Hes interacted with Anna Mae, and what gifts they gave her. In October 1999, friction began when the Hes wanted to take Anna Mae out of the Bakers' home and the Bakers refused. Louise Baker wrote "We would like to get visits to every other week. We feel like they would wean away, but the last 2 visits we could see Casey is wanting to come more." In November 1999, Jack He told Jerry Baker they wanted to regain custody of Anna Mae. Jerry replied that they did not want to give up Anna Mae and that Louise was pregnant and he didn't want her to miscarry. The Hes contacted the juvenile court officer several times during these months complaining about problems with visitation and talking about wanting to get custody back.

In May 2000, the Hes petitioned the Juvenile Court for custody. The petition was denied.

Jack found work in Georgia and Casey continued to visit Anna Mae until one day she refused to leave the Bakers' home. The police were called. Jack quit his job in Georgia after the Bakers told him that Casey was not allowed to visit Anna Mae by herself.

The Hes continued to visit Anna Mae until January 28, 2001, when an argument occurred at the Bakers' home. The Hes wanted to take Anna Mae to a photography studio for a family portrait on her second birthday, but the Bakers refused. The Bakers subsequently called the police. The Hes were told that they could not return to the Bakers' home. The police officer later testified that he said they could not return to the Bakers' house that day but the Hes believed they were being told that they could not return to the Bakers' home at all. The Hes did not see Anna Mae again for years.

The Hes contacted the Juvenile Court about regaining custody and in April 2001 filed to regain custody, but since only Casey signed, the petition was refiled on May 29. A hearing was set for June 6 but was rescheduled to June 22 so that the Bakers' lawyer could attend. Meanwhile, the Bakers were advised by their attorney to file to revoke the Hes' parental rights. On June 20, 2001, four months and five days after the January argument, they filed a petition for adoption and termination of parental rights in the Chancery Court of Shelby County. This halted the Hes' petition in juvenile court and transferred the case to chancery court.

Case history
In May 2000, the Hes petitioned Juvenile Court for custody of Anna Mae. The petition was denied.

In April 2001, the Hes petitioned Juvenile Court for custody of Anna Mae.

In June 2001, the Bakers petitioned Chancery Court to adopt Anna Mae, citing abandonment and lack of financial support from the Hes.

In 2002, Jack He came to David Siegel, a Memphis attorney, who agreed to take the case pro bono.

In May 2004, after a 10-day trial, Judge Robert L. Childers, a Tennessee circuit judge, terminated the Hes' parental rights on grounds of willful abandonment, despite the Hes persistent effort to regain custody via Juvenile Court. This decision was later affirmed by a majority in the Tennessee Court of Appeals on 2005-11-23. Siegel and the Hes subsequently appealed to the Tennessee Supreme Court.

In October 2006, the Hes argued at the Tennessee Supreme Court that the trial court erred in terminating their parental rights. They contended that the facts did not support a finding of willful abandonment, as their repeated effort to seek custody via juvenile court was a clear attempt to visit Anna Mae. After the oral argument, the Hes submitted a motion pro se to the Tennessee Supreme Court, asking the high court to rule on the custody issue directly. On how to interpret the word "temporary", in their pro se motion to the Tennessee Supreme Court, the Hes maintained that the temporary nature of the custody arrangement hinged on the temporary nature of the hardship they experienced at the time of the arrangement. Therefore, the Hes argued that they had superior parental rights over the custody dispute, as the exception laid out in a landmark Tennessee Supreme Court decision (Blair v. Badenhope) should apply.

In January 2007, the Tennessee Supreme Court, in a unanimous decision authored by Chief Justice William M. Barker, reversed the ruling by the state Court of Appeals and ordered that Anna Mae He be returned to her biological parents. In its ruling, the Court said, "We hold that the parents of Anna Mae He did not voluntarily transfer custody and guardianship of Anna Mae He to the Bakers with knowledge of the consequences and, therefore, are entitled to superior rights to custody" and "the evidence does not support a 'willful failure to visit' as a ground for abandonment." The Bakers were ordered to pay all legal fees associated with the case.

After the judgment was entered on February 2, 2007, the Bakers motioned the Tennessee Supreme Court to rehear the case and stay the custody transfer. The Tennessee Supreme Court promptly denied both motions (on 2007-02-09) and ordered the Bakers to pay costs "for which execution may issue if necessary."  Immediately thereafter, the Bakers petitioned the U.S. Supreme Court to stay the transfer of custody. The U.S. Supreme Court denied the Bakers' request on 2007-02-12.

The Bakers then petitioned for habeas corpus relief as "friend" of Anna Mae in U.S. Federal District Court, claiming that Anna Mae was under the custody of Tennessee state. The federal judge denied the petition.

The U.S. Supreme Court denied Bakers' petition for writ of certiorari in mid-2007, thus ending the legal battle. A delegate from the Chinese Embassy in Washington has attended every hearing, and Chinese Americans have followed developments.

Transfer of custody
After the final decision of the Tennessee Supreme Court, Anna Mae He was returned to her biological parents. The Bakers were not granted any residual rights over Anna Mae. The Bakers petitioned for appeal at the U.S. Supreme Court. They also twice sought to stop the custody transfer. The Court denied the Bakers' petition and their applications for stay of custody transfer. The Bakers then filed a lawsuit in Federal district court against the juvenile court and the attorney general of Tennessee; the court dismissed that suit for lack of subject matter jurisdiction. With legal recourse exhausted, the Bakers finally gave up.

On February 21, 2007, the Bakers released videos of Anna Mae, showing what they explained as Anna Mae He's rejection of her Chinese heritage, saying she would rather live in the United States over China, would not eat Chinese food anymore, and told people that she was Mexican. According to a report from USA Today dated February 21, 2007, Jerry Baker paid Anna Mae US$5 for each question she answered, such as "Where do you want to grow up United States or China?" and "What do you want your last name to be, Baker or He?"  The USA Today article noted that she refused to answer the question about her last name. Juvenile Court Judge Curtis Person expressed displeasure that Anna Mae was exposed to this media coverage in the Bakers' home, and threatened to issue a gag order if it continued.

Anna Mae had her first visit with the He family on March 15, 2007, in a two-hour visit at an undisclosed location that included a court-appointed psychologist. Judge Curtis Person has said that the psychologist will be responsible for arranging a series of meetings over a period of four weeks, with the visits increasing in duration and frequency.  According to Jack He, the first meeting proceeded much better than he and Casey He expected, and that Anna Mae was not crying, upset, or hostile.  The Bakers contended the meetings have emotionally traumatized Anna Mae, while David Siegel, the Hes' lawyer, says a court-appointed psychologist reported no unexpected problems with the get-togethers.A second meeting took place on March 18, 2007, also at an undisclosed location. A court-appointed guardian went to Jerry and Louise Bakers' Memphis home on Friday, July 20, 2007 to pick up Anna Mae He. Anna Mae was fully reunited with her biological parents on Monday, July 23, 2007.

Child advocacy specialist, Debbie Grabarkiewicz, working with A Child's Best Interest, a national child advocacy organization, argued for Anna Mae to stay with the Bakers and for Anna Mae to remain in the U.S.,  Anna Mae was "inconsolable" when she was moved and felt she had lost all control over her life. The Hes said she was initially hostile to them. She seemed angry and withdrawn, refused to eat or sleep in her own bed, and was afraid her parents were going to poison her. She was afraid of going to China, which she thought was remote and strange. Her parents say she began to warm up to them after her mother said they never agreed to give her up. Later her parents agreed to let her play with the Bakers' daughter, Aimee, who had always been her closest companion. She then began calling the Hes "Baba" — Chinese for "Daddy" — and "Mama". The Hes invited the Bakers to attend Anna's ninth birthday party on January 28, 2008, on the condition that the Bakers not cry and that they not call themselves "Mommy" and "Daddy" when they talked to Anna. While Louise and Jerry Baker attended the party, Jerry Baker's father did not attend because he didn't think he could refrain from crying.

The He family's legal residence in the U.S. was based on Jack He's student visa, which has long since expired. They were allowed to stay in the U.S. during the custody battle. When the legal fight was over, the He family agreed to go back to China to avoid deportation, although Anna Mae had lived in the U.S. her entire life and cannot speak Chinese. The He family boarded a plane to China on February 9, 2008, and had arrived in China by February 11, 2008. The Hes told Anna that they were going on vacation—when the family was interviewed by an ABC News crew in an airport in China and asked how long they would be staying there, Anna blurted out, "Two days!" before her father could respond and said her father's new job in Hunan was in Tennessee. Jack He corrected her. Jack He looked forward to introducing his children to his parents for the first time.

Life in China
The Hes hoped to enroll Anna in an international school that teaches in English. Jack He became an associate professor in the Hunan Vocational College of Science and Technology and was appointed director of the college's international exchange program. In 2008, he resigned for undisclosed personal reasons.

On July 31, 2008, local Memphis television station WMC-TV published an article stating that Jack He wanted to move back to the U.S. with his family, and that his children were not happy in China.  However, in an interview with Chinese newspaper Y Weekend, He said that he did not want to go back to the U.S., that WMC-TV took what he said "out of context," and that it "could not get a good show" from the interview, so it "deliberately made things up."  The reporter involved has denied these accusations. In an issued statement, she claimed that Jack He had asked for help returning to the United States "several times."

In the interview, Jack He further elaborated on Anna's upbringing with the Bakers. He said that while he felt the Bakers "subjectively love" Anna, the "actual effect" of her being with the Bakers "[has] not been good." He alleged that the Bakers told Anna that her parents were "illegal aliens who crossed...from...Mexican border and who [had] disappeared since," and that they told a USA Today reporter that Anna was "abandoned by her natural parents" whereas they "saved this abandoned child or else she would be sent back to the horrible place known as China."

In October 2008, local Memphis television Fox 13 reported that friends confirmed the separation of Jack and Casey He, with Casey having sole custody of the children, including Anna Mae.  Radio station 600 WREC in Memphis reported that Jack left the family in July after the two argued. Casey said that Jack wanted money from her family, offering her the three children for one hundred thousand dollars. She now lives near her family and said that she and the children are happy; all three of the children are in private schools where both Chinese and English are spoken. Casey does not know where Jack is and does not have his contact information.

A November 29, 2008, Associated Press story indicated that Anna Mae and her siblings attend a boarding school in Chongqing, China, during the week and visit their mother on weekends, when they also receive extra lessons in Chinese, art and piano. Their maternal uncle pays the tuition for the children's boarding school and also owns the two-bedroom apartment where the children live with their mother. Casey He told the reporter that sending the children to boarding school was a difficult decision, but her brother persuaded her it would be too difficult to manage the children's schoolwork and daily schedule if she did not. She visits them at the school three times a week in addition to seeing them on weekends. Anna Mae, who is a year behind in school because of her limited Chinese, told the reporter she doesn't like living at her boarding school and doesn't talk to her teachers or classmates because they can't understand her. She couldn't think of anything she liked about China, but said the best thing about school is going home to her mother. Anna Mae told the reporter she doesn't miss her father. Jack He told the reporter he hopes to reconcile with his wife, but he has filed for divorce and custody of all three of the children. As of November 2008, he hadn't seen Anna Mae or her siblings since July. Anna Mae speaks with her former foster parents, the Bakers, on the telephone once a week and they also send her packages filled with some of her favorite foods. Casey He spoke to the reporter about returning to the United States with the children, but said it would be difficult for her to find work there because of her limited English. She hopes that she might be able to eventually afford to send the children to an international day school in Chongqing.

In February 2010, Anna told an American ABC News reporter that she misses her classmates in Tennessee. She is still attending boarding school during the week with her brother and sister and reported having trouble with a recent test. She said she now considers herself both American and Chinese. In China she tells everyone that her mother is Casey He and doesn't mention Louise Baker because it is too complicated to explain her relationship to the Bakers, whom she still talks to regularly via telephone and over the Internet. Anna said "I would say it's fair and it's not fair" when the reporter asked if it was fair she had to move to China.

In the summer of 2011, Anna and her two siblings went to the US for summer vacation without their parents. They stayed at the Bakers' house. On August 15, 2011, Anna and her siblings returned to China.

See also

 Haigui
 Interracial adoption

References

Asian-American issues
Adoption history
Trials regarding custody of children